The following is a list of notable deaths in September 1992.

Entries for each day are listed alphabetically by surname. A typical entry lists information in the following sequence:
 Name, age, country of citizenship at birth, subsequent country of citizenship (if applicable), reason for notability, cause of death (if known), and reference.

September 1992

1
Desta Asgedom, 20, Ethiopian athlete, suicide.
Morris Carnovsky, 94, American actor.
Chick Harbert, 77, American golfer, stroke.
Piotr Jaroszewicz, 82, Polish politician, prime minister (1970–1980), murdered.
Sergey Senyukov, 37, Soviet high jumper and Olympian.
Ivan Tregubov, 62, Soviet ice hockey player.

2
Tahir Hasanov, 22, Azerbaijani soldier and war hero, killed in action.
Nam Jeong-im, 47, South Korean actress, breast cancer.
Sadeq Mallallah, 21-22, Saudi Arabian apostate, execution by beheading.
Barbara McClintock, 90, American geneticist, Nobel Prize recipient (1983).
Johnnie Mortimer, 61, English scriptwriter.
Baltasar Sangchili, 80, Spanish boxer.
Bert Zagers, 59, American gridiron football player.

3
César Bengzon, 96, Filipino judge, Chief Justice of the Philippines (1961–1966).
Bruno Bjelinski, 82, Croatian composer.
Sherm Chavoor, 72-73, American swimming coach.
Mahmoud Hessaby, 89, Iranian nuclear physicist and politician.
Eli Mandel, 69, Canadian poet.
P. Neelakantan, 75, Indian Tamil film director.
Sirimathi Rasadari, 60, Sri Lankan actress.
Joseph L. Rauh, Jr., 81, American civil rights and civil liberties lawyer.

4
Luis Cardoza y Aragón, 88, Guatemalan writer and diplomat.
Dan Deșliu, 65, Romanian poet, drowned.
Greg J. Holbrock, 86, American politician attorney and politician.
Fakhraddin Najafov, 24, Azerbaijani soldier and war hero, killed in action.
M. B. Ramachandra Rao, 86, Indian geophysicist.
John van Dreelen, 70, Dutch actor.

5
Ng Liang Chiang, 71, Singaporean hurdler.
Ron Davis, 50, American baseball player.
Billy Herman, 83, American baseball player, cancer.
Irving Allen Lee, 43, American actor (The Edge of Night), AIDS.
Fritz Leiber, 81, American author (Fafhrd and the Gray Mouser), stroke.
Yasuji Mori, 67, Japanese animator.
László Rajcsányi, 85, Hungarian fencer and Olympic champion.
Albert Rees, 71, American economist.
Hal Russell, 66, American free jazz composer, band leader and multi-instrumentalist.
Jens Arup Seip, 86, Norwegian historian.
Christopher Trace, 59, English actor and television presenter (Blue Peter), cancer.
Hans-Peter Zimmer, 55, German artist.

6
Ronnie Cahill, 77, American gridiron football player.
Henry Ephron, 81, American screenwriter (Captain Newman, M.D., Carousel, Desk Set).
Pat Harder, 70, American gridiron football player.
Mervyn Johns, 93, Welsh actor.
Ponjikara Raphi, 68, Indian Malayalam essayist, playwright, and novelist.
John Sutton, 73, English geologist.

7
Levan Abashidze, 29, Georgian actor and soldier, killed in battle.
Cyril Bence, 89, Welsh toolmaker and politician.
Arturo Dominici, 76, Italian actor.
Gerald Hanley, 76, Irish novelist.
Edward Kobyliński, 84, Polish rower and Olympic medalist.
Emilio Villalba Welsh, 86, Argentine screenwriter.

8
William Barrett, 79, American academic.
Quentin N. Burdick, 84, American politician, member of the U.S. Senate (since 1960), heart failure.
Guy Grantham, 92, British naval officer.
Donald Guthrie, 76, British theologian and New Testament scholar.
Hans-Otto Meissner, 83, German lawyer and nazi diplomat.

9
Maurice Burton, 94, British zoologist and science author.
Julian Creus, 75, British weightlifter and Olympic medalist.
William E. DePuy, 72, American Army general.
Carmelo Di Bella, 71, Italian football player.
Willie Fennell, 72, Australian actor, comedian and scriptwriter.
Imre König, 91, Hungarian-British chess master.

10
Louis Baes, 93, Belgian football player.
Harold L. Humes, 66, American novelist and counterculture figure.
Hanns Scharff, 84, German Luftwaffe interrogator.
Ivar Sjölin, 73, Swedish freestyle wrestler and Olympic medalist.
Evelyn Wellings, 83, Egyptian-English cricket player and journalist.

11
Else Germeten, 74, Norwegian film censor and politician.
Abubakar Gumi, 69, Nigerian Islamic scholar, leukemia.
Eiji Gō, 55, Japanese actor.
Frank McKinney, 53, American Olympic swimmer (1956, 1960), plane crash.
Frank Singuineau, 79, Trinidadian actor.

12
Mary Wells Ashworth, 89, American historian, aortic rupture.
Hans F. Koenekamp, 100, American special effects artist and cinematographer.
Mallikarjun Mansur, 81, Indian classical singer.
Ruth Nelson, 87, American actress (3 Women, The Late Show, Awakenings), cancer.
Ed Peck, 75, American actor (Happy Days, Bullitt, Major Dell Conway of the Flying Tigers), heart attack.
Anthony Perkins, 60, American actor (Psycho, Friendly Persuasion, The Black Hole), AIDS.
Emilio Recoba, 87, Uruguayan footballer.
Ron Woodroof, 42, American entrepreneur and creator of the Dallas Buyer's Club, AIDS-related pneumonia.

13
Dick Huffman, 69, American gridiron football player.
Lou Jacobs, 89, German-American clown.
Božidar Rašica, 79, Croatian architect, scenographer and painter.
Arseny Semionov, 81, Soviet painter and art teacher.

14
Somapala Dharmapriya, 51, Sri Lankan actor and cinematographer.
Ilse Dörffeldt, 80, German sprinter and Olympian.
Bruce Hutchison, 91, Canadian writer and journalist.
August Komendant, 85, Estonian-American structural engineer.
Paul Joseph James Martin, 89, Canadian politician.
Theodore S. Weiss, 64, American politician, member of the U.S. House of Representatives (since 1977), heart failure.

15
Pedro Formental, 77, Cuban-American baseball player.
Harvey Hardy, 69, American football player.
Walter B. Jones, Sr., 79, American politician, member of the U.S. House of Representatives (since 1966).
Michael Luciano, 83, American film editor (The Dirty Dozen, The Longest Yard, The Flight of the Phoenix).
Shubbo Shankar, 50, Indian graphic artist, musician and composer, pneumonia.

16
Larbi Benbarek, 75, French-Moroccan football player.
Millicent Fenwick, 82, American politician, heart failure.
Mogens Koch, 94, Danish architect.
Henri Legay, 72, French operatic tenor.
Jim Sullivan, Northern Irish politician and republican.
Victoria Wolf, 88, German-American writer.

17
Homayoun Ardalan, 42, Iranian Kurd politician, assassinated.
Feodor Chaliapin Jr., 86, Russian-Italian actor.
Herivelto Martins, 80, Brazilian composer and singer.
Ralph Schwarz, 25, Dutch rower and Olympian, plane crash.
Sadegh Sharafkandi, 54, Iranian Kurd politician, assassinated.
Judith Nisse Shklar, 63, Latvian-American political theorist.
Roger Wagner, 78, American musician.
 Yngve Casslind, 60, Swedish ice hockey player.

18
Lona Andre, 77, American actress.
David Bodian, 82, American medical scientist, Parkinson's disease.
Darío Cabanelas, 75, Spanish Arabist.
Princess Margaret of Denmark, 97, Danish royal.
Kevin Hanrahan, 39, American mobster (Patriarca crime family), shot.
Mohammad Hidayatullah, 86, Indian lawyer and Chief Justice.
Gustav Lombard, 97, German SS general during World War II.
Werner E. Reichardt, 68, German physicist and biologist.
Herbert W. Spencer, 87, Chilean-American film and television composer and orchestrator.
Earl Van Dyke, 62, American soul musician, prostate cancer.

19
Fritz Bauer, 86, German coxswain and Olympic champion.
Frederick Combs, 56, American actor (The Boys in the Band), AIDS.
Geraint Evans, 70, Welsh opera singer.
Kenny Howard, 63, American motorcycle mechanic, artist, and gunsmith.
Aida Imanguliyeva, 52, Azerbaijani scholar, cancer.
Jacques Pic, 59, French chef, heart attack.
Keith Stackpole, 76, Australian football player.
Alexander Trojan, 78, Austrian film actor.

20
Musa Anter, 72, Turkish Kurd writer, journalist and intellectual, assassinated.
Leon O. Jacobson, 80, American physician, medical researcher and educator.
Reuben Kadish, 79, American visual artist.
Harry Smyth, 82, Canadian speed skater and Olympian.
William L. Springer, 83, American politician, member of the U.S. House of Representatives (1951–1973).

21
Aleksandr Almetov, 52, Russian ice hockey player, pneumonia.
Tarachand Barjatya, 78, Indian film producer.
Paul de Metternich-Winneburg, 75, German-Austrian racing driver.
Harry J. Sonneborn, 77, American businessman and first president of McDonald's, diabetes.
Bill Williams, 77, American actor (The Adventures of Kit Carson), brain tumor, brain cancer.

22
Candido Amantini, 78, Italian Roman Catholic priest, theologian and exorcist.
Paul Bucy, 87, American neurosurgeon.
James Demouchette, 37, American convicted murderer, execution by lethal injection.
Aurelio López, 44, Mexican baseball player, traffic collision.
Aruna Shanthi, 66, Sri Lankan actor.

23
Frank P. Briggs, 98, American politician, member of the U.S. Senate (1945–1947).
Paul E. Garber, 93, American museum curator.
Ivar Ivask, 64, Estonian poet.
Mary Santpere, 79, Spanish actress.
Kalyan Sundaram, 88, Indian civil servant.
Glendon Swarthout, 74, American novelist, pulmonary emphysema.
James A. Van Fleet, 100, American Army general.

24
Christiane Barry, 74, French actress.
Roy Heffernan, 67, Australian professional wrestler, heart attack.
Pietro Magni, 73, Italian football player and manager.
Sarv Mittra Sikri, 84, Indian judge and Chief Justice.
Brownie Wise, 79, American pioneering saleswoman (Tupperware).

25
Igor Bakalov, 52, Soviet sports shooter and Olympian.
Tibor Kemény, 79, Hungarian football player and coach.
César Manrique, 73, Spanish artist, traffic collision.
Ivan Vdović, 31, Serbian drummer, AIDS.

26
Suimenkul Chokmorov, 52, Soviet-Kyrgyz film actor.
Ralph Davis, 70, American football player.
Pancrazio De Pasquale, 67, Italian politician.
Erich Krempel, 79, German Olympic sport shooter (1936).
Luka Lipošinović, 59, Yugoslavian football player.
Ralph Manheim, 85, American translator, prostate cancer.
Frank Patrick, 76, American gridiron football player.
Oiva Virtanen, 63, Finnish basketball player.
Aleksandr Voronin, 41, Russian weightlifter and Olympic champion, fall.

27
H. E. P. de Mel, 85, Sri Lankan politician, member of parliament of Ceylon.
Hugh Llewellyn Keenleyside, 94, Canadian diplomat, academic, and civil servant.
Charles Kramer, 85, American economist.
Zhang Leping, 81, Chinese comic artist.
Jacques-Paul Martin, 84, French Roman Catholic cardinal.
Hermann Neuberger, 72, German football official.
Keith Prentice, 52, American actor (The Boys in the Band, Dark Shadows, Cruising), AIDS-related cancer.

28
António Rodrigo Pinto da Silva, 80, Portuguese botanist and taxonomist.
William Douglas-Home, 80, British playwright.
John Leech, 66, British mathematician.
Olli Lehtinen, 77, Finnish Olympic boxer (1948).
Johanna Piesch, 94, Austrian mathematician.
Hu Qiaomu, 80, Chinese sociologist, marxist philosopher and politician.

29
Jean Aurenche, 89, French screenwriter.
Paul Jabara, 44, American songwriter ("Last Dance", "It's Raining Men"), AIDS.
Bill Rowe, 61, English sound engineer (The Last Emperor, The Killing Fields, Batman), Oscar winner (1988).
Kálmán Szepesi, 62, Hungarian table tennis player.

30
Nate Borden, 60, American gridiron football player, cancer.
Robert Joel, 48, American actor (A Very Natural Thing), AIDS.
Erwin Klein, 53, American table tennis player, shot.
Maria Malicka, 94, Polish stage and film actress.

References 

1992-09
 09